Københavns Idræts Forening (abbreviated Københavns IF, KIF) is a Danish athletics club based in the Østerbro district of Copenhagen.

The club is based at the Østerbro Stadium and the indoor Club Danmark Hallen in Valby. The club was founded in 1892 as Københavns Fodsports-Forening—the club adopted its current name in 1914—and is Denmark's oldest athletics club.

37 members of Københavns Idræts Forening have competed at the Olympic Games. Niels Holst-Sørensen, one of the club's athletes, won a gold medal in the 400 metres at the 1946 European Athletics Championships in Oslo. Gunnar Nielsen another of the club's athletes was 1955 world record holder at 1500 metres with 3.40.8.
By the time of its centenary in 1992, the club's members had won a total of 575 gold medals at the Danish championships—the club is second only to Sparta in the number of Danish champions that it has produced.

Famous athletes
 Christian Christensen
 Nick Ekelund-Arenander 
 Vilhelm Gylche
 Mogens Guldberg
 Niels Holst-Sørensen
 Kai Jensen
 Valther Jensen
 Henrik Jørgensen
 Wilson Kipketer
 Gunnar Nielsen
 Henry Petersen
 Aage Rasmussen
 Eugen Schmidt
 Ernst Schultz
 August Sørensen
 Marinus Sørensen

External links
 Official site 

Athletics clubs in Denmark
Sports teams in Copenhagen
Sports clubs established in 1892
1892 establishments in Denmark